Drewersburg is an unincorporated community in Whitewater Township, Franklin County, Indiana.

History
Drewersburg, originally called Edinburg, was platted in 1833. It was later named for William S. Drewer, who already lived in Drewersburg at the time of platting.

A post office was established as Drewersburg in 1837, and remained in operation until it was discontinued in 1903.

Geography

References

Unincorporated communities in Franklin County, Indiana
Unincorporated communities in Indiana